Rucheng is a town in Ruyuan Yao Autonomous County, Guangdong, China. It is the political, economic and cultural center of Ruyuan Yao Autonomous County.

Administrative division
As of 2016, the town is divided into five communities and thirteen villages: 
 Yingfeng Community
 Yuanfeng Community
 Yunfeng Community
 Songfeng Community
 Kangle Community
 Hebei
 Daqun
 Bachang
 Dalian
 Yunmen
 Xianming
 Lingxi
 Gonghe
 Xinmin
 Jianmin
 Dadong
 Qianjin
 Xinxing

History
Rucheng has been the county seat since 1368, at the dawn of the Ming dynasty (1368–1644).

In 1931, it split into two towns, Zhoujei and Fucheng. In 1941, it was renamed "Yunfeng Town", named after Yunmen Temple and Shuangfeng County.

In June 1957, it split into a town and a township, Fucheng Town and Hougongdu Township. In September 1958, Fucheng, Hougongdu Township and Longnan Township merged to form Xingfu People's Commune. It was renamed "Ruyuan Commune" in February 1959. In June 1962, a part of Ruyuan Commune was separated to establish Fucheng Commune. Fucheng Commune was renamed Chengguanzhen Commune in February 1963. In 1976, Chengguanzhen Commune was redesignated Rucheng Town. In 2005, the former Rucheng Town and Hougongtang Town merged to form the new Rucheng Town.

Geography
It lies at the southeastern of Ruyuan Yao Autonomous County, bordering Dongping Town to the west, Wujiang District to the south, the towns of Youxi and Yiliu to the north, and Wujiang District to the east.

Yunmen Mountain and Shuangfeng Mountain are the most famous mountains in the town.

The Nanshui River flows through  the town northwest to southeast.

Economy
The town's economy is based on agriculture, industry, and commerce. Its cement is very famous and sells well in Guangdong.

Demographics

As of 2018, the National Bureau of Statistics of China estimates the township's population now to be 68,143.

Tourist attraction
The Wenchang Pavilion is a Confucian temple located in the town, which was originally built in the Wanli period (1573–1620) of the Ming dynasty (1368–1644). The temple is renowned for its pagoda.

The Guanyin Temple is a Buddhist temple, its original temple dates back to the 16th century.

The Rucheng Hot Spring is a popular attraction.

Transportation
The G4 Beijing–Hong Kong and Macau Expressway, more commonly known as "Jing–Gang–Ao Expressway", is a northwest–southeast highway passing through the town's downtown, commercial, and industrial area of the town.

The National Highway G240, commonly abbreviated as G240, is also a northwest–southeast highway passing through the town's downtown, commercial, and industrial area of the town.

The National Highway G323, commonly abbreviated as G323, travels through the southwestern town.

The G0423 Lechang–Guangzhou Expressway, also popularly known as Le–Guang Expressway, is a north–south highway passing through the east of the town limits.

The Provincial Highway S250 connects the town to Guitou Town.

Notable people
, politician in the Song dynasty (960–1279).

References

Bibliography

 

Divisions of Ruyuan Yao Autonomous County
Towns in Guangdong